UPF0449 protein C19orf25 is a protein that in humans is encoded by the C19orf25 gene.

Interactions 

C19orf25 has been shown to interact with CCDC85B.

References

External links

Further reading